The D.C. United Academy is the youth and development program for the Major League Soccer club D.C. United. The program consists of teams at four age levels: the under-23 and under-20 teams, as well as the Academy (U-17, U-16, and U-15).

The D.C. United Academy has been one of the most successful MLS academies. Many players have been signed directly from the Academy to the professional team, or have later played professionally. Notable players to have graduated from the D.C United Academy include Bill Hamid, who has been called up by the U.S. national team and who was the MLS 2014 Goalkeeper of the Year, and Andy Najar, who has been capped for Honduras and who was the MLS 2010 Rookie of the Year.

History 
The D.C. United Academy was created in 2005 in an effort to provide local talent an opportunity to have professional training. D.C. United was one of the first MLS clubs to develop its own academy.
The D.C. United Academy gained some press in 2013 when D.C. United Academy graduate Michael Seaton made his league debut with D.C. United; Seaton was the first player to play an MLS game who was born after MLS began play in 1996. D.C. United decided in 2015, however, to reduce its outlays on its academy in part to help defray the expenses associated with the team's new soccer-specific stadium.

Structure 

Like most Major League Soccer teams, United's academy features youth pre-academy teams that ascend to the ranks of the senior team on the professional level. Starting in 2016, United will field their reserve team in the second-division USL Championship. Beneath their reserve and senior squads is the under-23 side, whom play exhibition matches.

The teenage brackets represent the main academy as well as the pre-academy structure. Players from the under-15 to the under-18 age level play in MLS Next, playing against other academy teams around the nation. Formerly, the academy played in the USSDA.

Consisting of players aged from under-12 to under-14, the Pre-Academy is a stepping stone for younger players to adapt to an academy setting. This age group of players participates in Northeast Pre-Academy League.

For players at the U-10 level and below, United offers specialty training camps.

D.C. United Academy is fully funded and does not charge any fees for its players.

Notable alumni 

Andy Najar, who transferred from D.C. United to Belgium's Anderlecht for a reported $2 million, was the first player from the D.C. United Academy — and first from any MLS academy — to move to Europe on a permanent contract. The youngest D.C. United Academy signing is Chris Durkin, who signed for D.C. United in 2016 at 16 years old.
Furthermore, several D.C. United Academy players have played with U.S. national youth teams.

MLS players
The following list includes players who, after leaving the D.C. United Academy, have played at least one match in Major League Soccer.

Notes: 
 D.C. United appearances updated as of November 29, 2020.
 Where a player has played with multiple levels of a national team (e.g., men's team, under-20 team, under-18 team), only the highest level is listed.

Source: D.C. United

The Academy

U16/U17 Team

U15 Team

U14 Team

Coaching staff 

|}

Reserves 

From 2005 until 2012, D.C. United fielded a reserve team that played in the MLS Reserve Division. The reserve team disbanded when Major League Soccer and USL Pro announced a player development partnership, and United announced Richmond Kickers as their USL Pro affiliate.

Honors 

 MLS Reserve Division: 1
2005

Seasons

See also 
 D.C. United
 D.C. United U-23
 D.C. United U-20
 U.S. Soccer Development Academy

References 
General
Academy alumni sourced to: 
Academy rosters sourced to: 
Footnotes

External links 
 D.C. United Academy
 D.C. United U-23's
 D.C. United U-18's
 D.C. United U-16's

Pre-Academy
 D.C. United Pre-Academy U-15's
 D.C. United Pre-Academy U-14's

Alumni
 Academy Alumni

Reserves and Academy
Reserve soccer teams in the United States
Soccer academies in the United States
2005 establishments in Washington, D.C.